Leigh Allison Wilson, (born October 23, 1957) is an American short story writer, and teacher. Her work has appeared in Harper's, Grand Street, and the Southern Review. Her story "Bullhead" was read on National Public Radio in 2008.

Biography
Wilson was born in Rogersville, Tennessee. She graduated from Williams College, magna cum laude, studied at University of Virginia, and graduated from Iowa Writers' Workshop with an MFA. She resides in Oswego, New York, where she teaches at the State University of New York at Oswego. She teaches at University of Nebraska, Omaha. Wilson's first book of stories, From the Bottom Up, was published by Penguin Books and won the Flannery O'Connor Award from the University of Georgia Press.

Awards
Flannery O'Connor Award for From The Bottom Up
Pulitzer Prize nominated for Wind
James A. Michener Fellow of the Copernicus Society

Works
"Bullhead", flashquake, Fall 2004, Volume 4, Issue 1
"Positional Vertigo", flashquake, Spring 2008, Volume 7 Issue 3

References

External links
Leigh Wilson at Oswego.edu
Official site with blog maintained by the author

1957 births
American short story writers
Living people
State University of New York at Oswego faculty